The Nevada Theatre, also known as the Cedar Theatre, located in downtown Nevada City, California, is California's oldest existing theater building. Its principal periods of significance were 1850–1874, 1875–1899, 1900–1924, and 1925–1949.

History
After the three-story Bailey House Hotel, at Broad and Bridge Streets, burned down in 1863, the Nevada Theatre Association began fundraising for a new building. Stock was sold at $100 a share, and a ball was held June 1865 to cover the remaining costs for the rustic vernacular Victorian building. The building's architect, builder, and engineer are unknown. When the theater opened on September 9, 1865, the first performance was the John Poole two-act comedy entitled The Dutch Governor, or 'Twould Puzzle a Conjurer.

Silent films were screened as early as 1908, and the theater underwent a remodel in 1909, retrofitted as a movie house. A slanted floor and electric lights were added in 1915. By 1957, it closed because of a sluggish economy, but it was later purchased through public donations and reopened in 1968.

Building
With over 200 seats, including balcony seating, the theater is in use year round for both live performance and movies. It is wheelchair accessible.

The backstage area is located under the stage and is painted baby blue. It includes a small room with makeup mirrors.

Performers
Notable past performers include Lotta Crabtree, Mötley Crüe, Jack London, Emma Nevada, Mark Twain, and The Second City comedy troupe.

Present day main users include:
 LeGacy Productions
 Nevada Theatre Film Series
 Sierra Stages
 Community Asian Theatre of the Sierra
 Wild & Scenic Environmental Film Festival

Commissions
The Nevada County Liberal Arts Commission was formed in the 1960s to purchase the building from United Artists. The Nevada Theatre Commission, a 501(c)(3) nonprofit corporation, followed the first commission and, with a Board of Directors, is the governing body of the Nevada Theatre. It owns, operates, restores, and utilizes the theater "To preserve and develop the historic Nevada Theatre and its other historic properties in order to provide the community with an accessible, usable and valuable cultural asset" (Mission Statement).

Landmark
The theater is registered as California Historical Landmark No. 863, and was listed in the National Register of Historic Places on March 14, 1973. The landmark plaque reads:
CALIFORNIA'S OLDEST EXISTING THEATRE BUILDING, THE NEVADA OPENED SEPTEMBER 9, 1865. CELEBRITIES SUCH AS MARK TWAIN, JACK LONDON, AND EMMA NEVADA HAVE APPEARED ON ITS STAGE. CLOSED IN 1957, THE THEATRE WAS LATER PURCHASED THROUGH PUBLIC DONATIONS AND REOPENED MAY 7, 1968 TO AGAIN SERVE THE CULTURAL NEEDS OF THE COMMUNITY.
CALIFORNIA REGISTERED HISTORICAL LANDMARK NO. 863
PLAQUE PLACED BY THE STATE DEPARTMENT OF PARKS AND RECREATION IN COOPERATION WITH THE HISTORICAL LANDMARKS AND LIBERAL ARTS COMMISSIONS OF NEVADA COUNTY, APRIL 27, 1974.

See also
National Register of Historic Places listings in Nevada County, California
California Historical Landmarks in Nevada County

References

External links
 Official Nevada Theatre website
 Landmark designation at Office of Historic Preservation, California State Parks

Theatres in California
Cinemas and movie theaters in California
Buildings and structures in Nevada City, California
History of Nevada City, California
Theatres completed in 1865
California Historical Landmarks
Theatres on the National Register of Historic Places in California
National Register of Historic Places in Nevada County, California
Organizations established in 1865
Tourist attractions in Nevada County, California
Victorian architecture in California
Arts organizations established in the 1860s